Świerże may refer to:
Świerże, Chełm County in Lublin Voivodeship (east Poland)
Świerże, Radzyń Podlaski County in Lublin Voivodeship (east Poland)
Świerże, Masovian Voivodeship (east-central Poland)

See also
Świercze (disambiguation)